Caroline Flanagan served as president of the Law Society of Scotland from 2005 to 2006 and was the first woman to hold that post. She is also the youngest ever person to hold the post.

Flanagan is a partner at the Dunfermline law firm Ross & Connel and is an accredited family law specialist. She was first elected to the Law Society of Scotland Council in 1998 after working as a client relations committee member for five years.

She attended Dollar Academy. She is married to Roy Flanagan and has two children, Claire and James.

References

Year of birth missing (living people)
Living people
People educated at Dollar Academy
Scottish solicitors
Scottish lawyers
21st-century Scottish lawyers
Scottish women lawyers
20th-century Scottish lawyers
20th-century women lawyers
21st-century women lawyers
20th-century Scottish women